Niels Madsen (born 22 August 1964) is a Danish boxer. He competed in the men's light heavyweight event at the 1988 Summer Olympics.

References

External links
 

1964 births
Living people
Danish male boxers
Olympic boxers of Denmark
Boxers at the 1988 Summer Olympics
Sportspeople from Copenhagen
Light-heavyweight boxers